The House of Szapáry (Hungarian: Szapáry de Muraszombath, Széchysziget et Szapár) is the name of an old and important Hungarian noble family, which derived its name from the village of Szapár. The family belonged to the Hungarian nobility. Members of this family held the title of Imperial Count (Hungarian: grof) granted to them on 28 December 1722 by Charles VI, Holy Roman Emperor and many of them played a prominent role in the history of the Austro-Hungarian Empire.

Notable family members
Etelka Szapáry (1798–1876), Hungarian noblewoman.
László Szapáry (1831–1883), Austro-Hungarian general who played a leading role in the occupation of Bosnia and Herzegovina in 1878.
Gyula Szapáry, (1832–1905), Prime Minister of Hungary from 1890 to 1892.
Frigyes Szapáry (1869–1935), Ambassador of the Austro-Hungarian Empire to the Russian Empire at the outbreak of World War I, who played a key role during the July Crisis of 1914. He is the grandfather of Princess Michael of Kent.
György Szapáry (born 1938), economist and diplomat.

Related people
Princess Michael of Kent – on her maternal grandfather's side.

References

Hungarian families